Erroll Bennett (born 7 May 1950) is a former Tahitian footballer, who spent most of his career with AS Central Sport. Bennett placed fifteenth in a 1999 poll by International Federation of Football History & Statistics to find the Player of the Century for Oceania.

Bennett was part of the Tahitian national squad for the 1973 Oceania Cup, the first ever Oceania-wide international soccer tournament. Bennett scored three goals in the tournament, and played in the final, which Tahiti lost 2–0 to New Zealand.

He joined the Church of Jesus Christ of Latter-day Saints (LDS Church) in 1977 after which he refused to play football on Sundays. Following Bennett's baptism, Napoléon Spitz, the head of Bennett's team, held a meeting in which he said his team would stop Sunday play and all football teams in that division agreed to move games to weeknights. 

Bennett was also a police officer in Tahiti. He is the father of Naea Bennett, who also played for Tahiti national team.

References
Michael Otterson. "Erroll Bennett: Tahitian Soccer Star", Ensign, Oct. 1982.
Meridian Magazine article with section on Bennett

1950 births
Converts to Mormonism
French Polynesian Latter Day Saints
Living people
French Polynesian footballers
Tahiti international footballers
French Polynesian police officers
1973 Oceania Cup players
1980 Oceania Cup players
Association football forwards